Whitman Plaza is the largest shopping center in the Whitman neighborhood of South Philadelphia, Pennsylvania. It is located adjacent to Baby Saigon, the Vietnamese neighborhood market in which Oregon Market resides.

Whitman Plaza is locally maintained by Breslin Realty and the Whitman Council neighborhood civic organization. Neighborhood groups have created the Whitman Plaza community group to organize neighborhood gatherings within the plaza and surrounding area.

Tenants 
Current shopping plaza tenants include: ShopRite, Burlington Coat Factory, Ross Dress For Less, PetValu, H&R Block, GNC, Gamestop, Citizens Bank, Dunkin Donuts, Sally Beauty, Party City, Rent-A-Center, Club Metro USA, PennDOT Driver License Center, Rainbow, Teppanyaki Grill, MRCP Physical Therapy

Whitman Cat Colony 
The Whitman Cat Colony refers to a colony of about 100 stray and feral cats located in the back parking ground of Whitman Plaza. The Whitman Cat Colony began as a dumping ground for unwanted cats, but grew into a cat colony maintained by local volunteers. Caretakers of the colony provide food, water, and shelter for these cats. They also organize a Trap-Neuter-Release program, in which unaltered cats are taken to low-cost vets or clinics to get altered and vaccinated then returned to the colony. The vet doing the surgery will usually snip a small piece of skin from the cat's ear to indicate that the cat has been altered so as to signify who has been altered in the colony and who has not (signaling who are the resident cats and who are the new “drop offs”).

References 

Shopping malls in Pennsylvania
Economy of Philadelphia
South Philadelphia